Maleace Kobe Asamoah (born 15 November 2002) is an English professional footballer who plays as a forward for New Salamis.

Club career
Growing up, Asamoah spent time in the Reading academy. In 2020, he joined Isthmian League side Cheshunt playing in one FA Trophy match away to Lowestoft Town in a 3-0 Victory. He played alongside his father Derek In August 2021, he joined Super League Greece 2 side Kalamata. On 6 October 2021, he made his debut as a substitute in a 2–0 loss to Levadiakos in the Greek Football Cup. On 7 January 2022, he joined Olympiacos Volos on loan until the end of the season. On 23 January 2022, Asamoah made his professional league debut as a substitute for Olympiacos Volos in a 2–1 defeat to Larissa. In February 2023, he was back in England playing alongside his father for Isthmian League side New Salamis.

Personal life
Asamoah is the son of former Ghana international, Derek, and the pair played together in a match for Cheshunt.

Career statistics

References

External links

2002 births
Living people
English sportspeople of Ghanaian descent
English footballers
Association football forwards
Cheshunt F.C. players
Kalamata F.C. players
Olympiacos Volos F.C. players
Super League Greece 2 players
Expatriate footballers in Greece
English expatriate sportspeople in Greece
English expatriate footballers
Isthmian League players